The Last Photograph is a 2017 British drama film directed by and starring Danny Huston. Its screenplay was written by Simon Astaire based on his own novel.

Plot
In 2003, Tom Hammond, a middle-aged man, searches for a stolen photograph of his son Luke, which was taken shortly before he was killed in the 1988 bombing of Pan Am Flight 103 on his way to New York City to meet a girl.

Cast
 Danny Huston as Tom Hammond
 Sarita Choudhury as Hannah
 Stacy Martin as Bird
 Jonah Hauer-King as  Luke Hammond
 Vincent Regan as Mark
 Michelle Ryan as Maryam
 Jaime Winstone

Release
The film had its world premiere at the Edinburgh International Film Festival in June 2017. For the United States, Freestyle Digital Media acquired the rights to the film and released it  theatrically and on video on demand on 6 September 2019.

Reception
Wendy Ide of Screen International wrote that "the story feels a little thin" and that "although the story deals with emotionally wrenching themes, there is a coolness here which keeps us at arm's length". Eddie Harrison of The List gave the film a score of 4 out of 5, writing, "Where 2010's Remember Me used the 9/11 attacks as a punchline, The Last Photograph seeks out where the story hurts the most and sticks with it. The narrative is simple and contrivances are few – this film is about bereavement, short and sharp."

References

External links
 
 

2017 films
British drama films
Films about terrorism in Europe
Films directed by Danny Huston
Pan Am Flight 103
2017 drama films
2010s English-language films
2010s British films